The Californians is a half-hour Western television series, set during the California Gold Rush of the 1850s, which was broadcast by NBC from September 24, 1957, to May 26, 1959, for 69 episodes.

Cast
The series was set in San Francisco. Adam Kennedy starred in the first year in early episodes as Dion Patrick, an Irish newspaperman who helps the local vigilante committee.  Season one episodes also featured Sean McClory as store owner Jack McGivern, who headed the vigilante committee and Nan Leslie as his wife, Martha McGivern.  Early season one episodes featured Herbert Rudley as newspaper editor Sam Brennan but Jack McGivern later took over the newspaper. Due to sagging ratings, Richard Coogan was brought in in later season one episodes; his introduction boosted ratings, and led to the departure of Kennedy and McCrory. In season two, Coogan stars as Matthew Wayne, a sheriff and then marshal who organizes the city police, courts a young widow, Wilma Fansler, portrayed by Carole Mathews, and clashes with an ambitious attorney, Jeremy Pitt, played by Art Fleming, later the original host of Jeopardy!.  At the end of season two, Matt departs when the vigilante committee becomes active again, and the last episode has James Coburn as Matt's cousin, Anthony "(Pittsburgh)" Wayne, taking over as deputy marshal and series lead; however, the show was not renewed for a third season.

Guest stars 

Charles Aidman
Frank Albertson
Chris Alcaide
Fred Aldrich
John Anderson
John Archer
R.G. Armstrong
Rayford Barnes
Whit Bissell
Robert Blake
Willis Bouchey
George Brenlin
Edgar Buchanan
James T. Callahan
James Coburn
Fred Coby
Mike Connors
Hans Conried
Russ Conway
Bill Coontz
Robert O. Cornthwaite
Ted de Corsia
Robert L. Crawford, Jr.
Frank Dekova
Troy Donahue
John Doucette
Douglass Dumbrille
Douglas Fowley
Robert Fuller
Bruce Gordon
Herman Hack
Don Haggerty
James Hong
Russell Johnson
Allyn Joslyn
Robert Karnes
Stacy Keach, Sr.
Ray Kellogg
Tommy Kirk
Gail Kobe
Michi Kobi
Ethan Laidlaw
Lyle Latell
Keye Luke
Patricia Medina
Don Megowan
Gerald Mohr
Jimmy Noel
Robert Osborne
J. Pat O'Malley
Richard Reeves
Stafford Repp
Addison Richards
Carlos Romero
Vito Scotti
James Seay
Alex Sharp
Quentin Sondergaard
Arthur Space
Bob Steele
John Sutton
Ray Teal
Joan Tompkins
Sammee Tong
Audrey Totter
Maria Tsien
Lurene Tuttle
James Westerfield
Peter Whitney
Jean Willes
Marie Windsor

Episode list

Season 1: 1957–58

Season 2: 1958–59

Production notes
The Californians theme song was composed by Harry Warren, with lyrics by Harold Adamson, entitled "I've Come to California". Ken Darby, of the Ken Darby Singers, did some of the musical composition for the series.

The Californians had competition from The West Point Story, which was broadcast by the American Broadcasting Company, and The $64,000 Question by CBS. In its second season, the western competed with The Garry Moore Show on CBS and the crime/police reality show Confession, hosted by Jack Wyatt, on ABC.

References

External links 
 

1957 American television series debuts
1959 American television series endings
Television series set in the 1850s
NBC original programming
1950s Western (genre) television series
Television shows set in San Francisco
Black-and-white American television shows
English-language television shows
California Gold Rush in fiction
Television series by CBS Studios